Pod Vinicí is a football stadium in Pardubice, Czech Republic. It is the former home stadium of FK Pardubice. The total capacity is 2,500, including 600 seated.

In 2012 FK Pardubice invested over one million CZK in the redevelopment of the seating in order to meet league requirements as the team was promoted to the Czech 2. Liga. In September 2011 a crowd of around 3,000 watched the third round 2011–12 Czech Cup match against Sparta Prague at the stadium.

References

Football venues in the Czech Republic
Sport in Pardubice
Buildings and structures in Pardubice
Sports venues completed in 1934
FK Pardubice
1934 establishments in Czechoslovakia
20th-century architecture in the Czech Republic